Théâtre Maisonneuve is a theatre in Montreal, Quebec, Canada. It is located at Place des Arts in the Quartier des spectacles neighbourhood in the borough of Ville-Marie.

Théâtre Maisonneuve was inaugurated in 1967 and was named for the founder of Montreal, Paul Chomedey de Maisonneuve.

The theatre has 1,453 seats and is used for variety shows, benefits small ensembles and soloists, musicals and films. Regularly, it also presents the benefits of Les Grands Ballets Canadiens, the Orchestre Métropolitain, I Musici de Montreal and the Pro Musica Society. Quebec Issime presents his show every year.

References

Further reading
S Alix; T Reiner, Acoustics study, Theatre Maisonneuve, 1973

External links
 Venue Info

Theatres in Montreal
Buildings and structures completed in 1967
Music venues in Montreal
Modernist architecture in Canada
Quartier des spectacles